Steve Eastin (born June 22, 1948) is an American character actor. He has appeared in nearly 150 television and film roles throughout his decades long career.

Early life and education 
Eastin was born in Colorado, where he began to study acting at the young age of six at his local theater. He received his Actor Equity card at age 16 when he performed in two musicals choreographed by Micheal Bennet. Later, he attended the University of Northern Colorado, where he appeared in several productions at the Little Theater of the Rockies, whose alumni include Nick Nolte.

After college, Eastin received a fellowship to teach at the University of Arizona, where he appeared in his first SAG role opposite Clint Eastwood in Joe Kidd. Eastin moved to Los Angeles to further pursue his acting career, enrolling in the Charles Conrad Studio upon arrival in 1974.

Career 
While attending Charles' class, Eastin became interested in teaching acting as well. In 1991, he founded his own acting school, the Steve Eastin Studio. The studio teaches what Eastin refers to as "Choiceless awareness", where the actors do not read into the script, nor prepare their "beats" or think about what or how they may read their lines.

Eastin is best known for appearing in such films as Field of Dreams (1989), Con Air (1997) and A Man Apart (2003). He played opposite Leonardo DiCaprio in two pivotal scenes in Catch Me if You Can (2002).

Eastin is also known for his numerous television appearances, including on Little House on the Prairie, CHiPS, T.J. Hooker, St. Elsewhere and L.A. Law.

Personal life 
He is a descendant of the D'Estaing family of France.

Filmography

Film

Television

References 

1948 births
American male film actors
American male television actors
Living people
University of Northern Colorado alumni
Male actors from Colorado
Male actors from Los Angeles
20th-century American male actors
21st-century American male actors